The Yerevan Zoo, also known as the Zoological Garden of Yerevan ( (Yerevani kendabanakan aygi)), is a  zoo established in 1940 in Yerevan, Armenia.

Animals
At present the zoo is home to about 3000 individuals representing 300 species. Species representing the South Caucasus and Armenia include Syrian brown bears, Bezoar goats, vipers, Armenian mouflon, Red Deer and black vultures. Other species at the zoo from around the world include African lions (including a white lion), Siberian tigers , Jaguars, Leopards, Zebras, Alpacas, Llamas, Przewalski’s Horses, Père David’s Deer, Hippos, Kangaroos, Mandrills, spotted hyenas, Interior alaskan wolves, Moon Bears, Barbary Sheep, Bactrian Camels, Caucasian lynx and an Indian elephant named Grantik.

Conservation

Since Armenia is a biodiversity hot spot, the Foundation for the Preservation of Wildlife and Cultural Assets (FPWC) has leased and taken over management of about  near the Khosrov reserve, which until recently had been unprotected and at risk of poaching, illegal logging, and overgrazing. The Yerevan Zoo is cooperating with the FPWC to use this land for wildlife rehabilitation and the reintroducing critically endangered species of the area into the wild.

Education

In 2012 the zoo, in cooperation with the Foundation for the Preservation of Wildlife and Cultural Assets (FPWC), the municipality of Yerevan, and the Artis Zoo in Amsterdam, will open a zoo school. The main purpose of this school will be to teach schoolchildren the importance of biodiversity in Armenia and around the world, and it will use the zoo as an interactive classroom.

The future
In April 2011 the Director of the FPWC took over control of the zoo to help change what the zoo itself describes as "unbearable conditions". The zoo will be partnering with the Artis Zoo (among others) to upgrade and renovate the zoo to modern standards. The second phase is due to be completed in 2017.

References

External links

Yerevan Zoo

Zoo
Tourist attractions in Yerevan
Zoos in Armenia
Zoos established in 1940